The Medawar Lecture was an annual lecture on the philosophy of science organised by the Royal Society of London in memory of Sir Peter Medawar. It was last delivered in 2004 after which it was merged with the Wilkins Lecture and the Bernal Lecture to form the Wilkins-Bernal-Medawar Lecture.

List of lecturers

References 

Royal Society lecture series
Philosophy of science
Philosophy events
Annual events in the United Kingdom